Lam Pao is a tributary of the Chi River in northeast Thailand.

The river originates at the Nong Han Kumphawapi Lake in Udon Thani Province, from where it flows through Kalasin Province until it flows into the Chi at the boundary between Kalasin and Roi Et Province.

In northern Kalasin the Lam Pao Dam was built in 1963–1968, storing  of water for flood prevention and agriculture.

Pao
Dams in Thailand